Aaron R. Dean II (born May 20, 1964) is a United States Army brigadier general (BG) and the adjutant general (TAG) of the District of Columbia National Guard (DCNG). As the TAG for the DCNG, Dean is responsible for providing personnel support to both Army and Air National Guard components. Dean acts as the auxiliary support to the commanding general of the DCNG, while concurrently carrying out many responsibilities associated with the District of Columbia's constitution and directives. In addition to this, he is responsible for managing the assets of the entire DCNG. He collaborates with the National Guard Bureau (NGB) concerning funding and administrative and procurement processes that affects the DCNG.

Education

BG Dean received a Bachelor of Arts degree in criminal justice from Washington State University in 1987.  He received two master's degrees. Dean received a Masters of Public Administration from Troy State University in 2002 and a Master of Science degree from the National Defense University within the school of National Security Strategy, in 2008.

List of military schools attended:
National Defense University: 2008
National War College: 2008
Command General Staff College: 2000
Combined Armed Services School: 1995
Military Police Officer Advanced Course: 1994
Military Police Officer Basic Course: 1987

Military career

BG Dean received an Army ROTC Commission from the Washington State University in 1984. Upon commissioning, he was appointed to the Washington Army National Guard (WAARNG) as an Air Defense Section Leader.

Dean joined the DCNG in 1985. His first assignment as a commander came in 1989, with the 274th Military Police company. In the earlier part of 1991, the DCNG was mobilized along with other National Guard units in order to participate in the Persian gulf conflict.  Captain (CPT) Dean, during that time period, along with other unit commanders within the DCNG, prepared many troops to participate in the battle to liberate Kuwait.   This conflict occurred due to Iraq's refusal to respond to the United Nations (UN) deadline.

Dean continued to serve within the DCNG after the Persian gulf conflict.  He was later assigned to serve as the commander for other units within the DCNG.  Many of his other assignments are listed within the military assignments section on this page.

Dean supports numerous events and programs, such as -residential inaugurations, the DCNG Warrant Officer's 100-year history celebration event and critical partnerships, such as the Jamaica Defense Force and the Jamaica State Partnership Program. Dean was second in charge during the DC National Guard response to the January 6th Insurrection.

Military assignments

2018–present: The Adjutant General, DCNG, Washington, DC
2017–2018: Commander, Headquarters and Headquarters Detachment, Area Mobilization Command, Washington, District of Columbia
2017–2017: Commander, Land Component Command (Acting), DCNG, Washington, DC
2015–2017: Chief of Staff, DC Army National Guard, Washington, DC
2014–2015: G3, Deputy Chief of Staff for Operations, DCNG, Washington, DC
2013–2014: Director of Plans Operations and Training (J3), JFHQ-DC, DCNG, Washington, DC
2011–2013: Commander, 74th Troop Command, DCNG, Washington, DC
2009–2011: Director of Plans and Operations and Training (J3), Military Support, JFHQ-DC, DCNG, Washington, DC 
2008–2009: Deputy J3, Armed Forces Inaugural Committee, DCNG, Washington, DC 
2007–2008: National War College 
2005–2006: Commander, 372nd Military Police Battalion (Combat Tour in Iraq) 
2002–2004: Chief, Training Division, JFHQ-DC, DCNG, Washington, DC 
2001–2002: Executive Officer, 372nd Military Police Battalion, DCNG, Washington, DC 
1998–2001: Plans and Operations Officer, 260th Military Police Command, DCNG, Washington, DC 
1996–1998: S-3, 372nd Military Police Battalion, DCNG, Washington, DC  
1992–1996: Rear Battle Officer, 372nd Military Police Battalion, DCNG, Washington, DC 
1989–1992: Commander, 274th Military Police Company (active duty Desert Storm) 
1988–1989: Platoon leader, 273rd Military Police Company, DCNG, Washington, DC
1985–1988: Military police platoon leader Detachment 1, WAARNG

Awards and decorations

BG Dean's federal awards include: 

DCNG Awards:

BG Dean also received the Major General Charles Southward Leadership award and the Army Physical Fitness Badge.

Dates of promotions

Civilian service
During his civilian service, BG Dean, served as the director of the Enrollment Division for Blue Cross and Blue Shield of the National Capital Area in Washington, D.C. The company is responsible for ensuring over 2 million people in the region. 
Dean also served on the school board, as the treasurer, for the Imagine Hope Public Charter School, located in D.C., during 2016-2017. He is currently a member of Kappa Alpha Psi fraternity.

References

Living people
National Guard (United States) generals
Washington State University alumni
Troy University alumni
National Defense University alumni
1964 births